Events from the year 1788 in the United States.

Incumbents

Federal Government 
President: Cyrus Griffin (starting January 29)
Congress of the Confederation

Events

 January 2 – Georgia ratifies the United States Constitution and becomes the 4th U.S. state under the new government (see History of Georgia).
 January 9 – Connecticut ratifies the United States Constitution and becomes the 5th U.S. state (see History of Connecticut).
 January 22 – the Continental Congress, effectively a caretaker government, elects Cyrus Griffin as its last president.
 February 1 – Isaac Briggs and William Longstreet patent the steamboat in Georgia.
 February 6 – Massachusetts ratifies the United States Constitution and becomes the 6th U.S. state (see History of Massachusetts).
 March 21 – Great New Orleans Fire (1788) kills 25% of the population and destroys 856 buildings, including St. Louis Cathedral and the Cabildo, leaving most of the town in ruins. At the time New Orleans was a Spanish colony that would be secretly given to France in 1800. Not until 1803 would New Orleans as part of the Louisiana Purchase become part of the United States.
 April 7 – American pioneers establish the town of Marietta (in modern-day Ohio), the first permanent American settlement outside the original Thirteen Colonies.
 April 13 – A riot, the Doctors' Mob, begins. Residents of Manhattan are angry about grave robbers stealing bodies for doctors to dissect. The rioting is suppressed on the 15th.
 April 28 – Maryland ratifies the United States Constitution and becomes the 7th U.S. state (see History of Maryland).
 May 23 – South Carolina ratifies the United States Constitution and becomes the 8th U.S. state (see History of South Carolina).
 June 21 – New Hampshire ratifies the United States Constitution and becomes the 9th U.S. state (see History of New Hampshire), the Constitution goes into effect.
 June 25 – Virginia ratifies the United States Constitution and becomes the 10th U.S. state under the new government (see History of Virginia).
 July 26 – New York ratifies the United States Constitution and becomes the 11th U.S. state (see History of New York).
 November 15 – Cyrus Griffin resigns as President of the Continental Congress after only two delegates arrived for the final session.

Ongoing
 Articles of Confederation in effect (1781–1788)
 Northwest Indian War (1785–1795)

Births

 April 14 – David Gouverneur Burnet, politician (died 1870)
 September 15 – Gerard Brandon, 4th and 6th Governor of Mississippi from 1825 till 1826 and from 1826 till 1832. (died 1850)
 September 21 – Margaret Taylor, First Lady of the United States (died 1852)
 November 8 – Jabez W. Huntington, United States Senator from Connecticut from 1840 till 1847. (died 1847)
 Date unknown – Sacagawea, interpreter and guide on the Lewis and Clark Expedition (died 1812)

Deaths

 January 9 – Benedict Swingate Calvert, judge (born c. 09708970-1732)
 February 28 – Thomas Cushing, 1st Lieutenant Governor of Massachusetts (born 171223525)
 March 29 – Charles Wesley (born 1707)

See also
Timeline of the American Revolution (1760–1789)

References

External links
 

 
1780s in the United States
United States
United States
Years of the 18th century in the United States